Swanzy is a surname. Notable people with the surname include:

Henry Swanzy (1915–2004), British radio producer
Henry Rosborough Swanzy (1843–1913), Irish ophthalmic surgeon
Mary Swanzy (1882–1978), Irish artist